Sarajuy may refer to:
Sarajuy-ye Gharbi Rural District
Sarajuy-ye Jonubi Rural District
Sarajuy-ye Sharqi Rural District
Sarajuy-ye Shomali Rural District